Palmaria is a genus of algae.  One of its most notable members is dulse, Palmaria palmata.

References

Florideophyceae
Red algae genera
Taxa named by John Stackhouse